This is a list of castles and chateaux located in the Ústí nad Labem Region of the Czech Republic.

A
 Ahníkov Chateau

B
 Benešov nad Ploučnicí Chateau
 Bílence Chateau
 Bílina Chateau
 Blansko Castle
 Blatno Chateau
 Blšany u Loun Chateau
 Boreč Chateau
 Brňany Chateau
 Brocno Chateau
 Brody Chateau
 Brtnický hrádek Castle
 Budyně nad Ohří Castle

C
 Chomutov Castle
 Chrámce Chateau
 Chřibský hrádek Castle
 Červený hrádek Chateau
 Čížkovice Chateau
 Cítoliby Chateau

D
 Děčín Chateau
 Dlažkovice Chateau
 Dobříčany Chateau
 Doubravská Hora Castle
 Duchcov Chateau
 Dvojhradí Chateau

E
 Egerberk Castle
 Encovany Chateau

F
 Falkenštejn Castle
 Fredevald Castle
 Funkštejn Castle

H
 Hasištejn Castle
 Hausberk Castle
 Házmburk Castle
 Hliňany Chateau
 Hněvín Castle
 Horní Beřkovice Chateau
 Hrad na Blešenském vrchu Castle
 Hrádek u Úštěku Castle
 Hrdly Chateau

J
 Janov Chateau
 Jezeří Chateau
 Jílové Chateau

K
 Kadaň Castle
 Kalich Castle
 Kamenice Castle
 Kamýk (u Litoměřic) Castle
 Kaštice Chateau
 Kyjovský hrádek Castle
 Klášterec nad Ohří Chateau
 Konojedy Chateau
 Kostomlaty pod Milešovkou Castle
 Kostomlaty pod Milešovkou Chateau
 Košťany Chateau
 Košťálov Castle
 Krásné Březno Chateau
 Krásný Buk Castle
 Krásný Dvůr Chateau
 Krásný Les Chateau
 Krupka Castle
 Kryry Castle
 Křečov Castle
 Křemýž Chateau
 Kyšperk Castle

L
 Leština Castle
 Levín Castle
 Libčeves Chateau
 , Liběšice, Litoměřice District
 Libochovany Chateau
 Libochovice Chateau
 Libočany Chateau
 Libořice Chateau
 Libouchec Chateau
 Lichtenwald Chateau
 Lipno Chateau
 Lipová - starý zámek Chateau
 Lipová Chateau
 Litoměřice Castle
 Litvínov Chateau
 Litýš Castle
 Líčkov Chateau
 Lovosice Chateau
 Lukavec Chateau
 Lužec Chateau

M
 Měcholupy Chateau
 Milčeves Chateau
 Milešov Chateau
 Milošice Chateau
 Most Castle
 Mšené Chateau

N
 Najštejn Castle
 Nepomyšl Chateau
 Neznámý hrad u Albrechtic Castle
 Nový Hrad Chateau
 Nový Žeberk Castle

O
 Oltářík Castle
 Opárno Castle
 Ostrý Castle
 Ostrý Castle

P
 Panenský Týnec Chateau
 Panna Castle
 Paradies Castle
 Perštejn Castle
 Peruc Chateau
 Petrohrad Castle
 Petrohrad Chateau
 Ploskovice Chateau
 Pnětluky Chateau
 Postoloprty Chateau
 Pravda Castle

R
 Roudnice nad Labem Chateau
 Rybňany Chateau
 Rýzmburk Castle

S
 Schönbuch Castle
 Skalka Castle
 Skalka Chateau
 Snědovice Chateau
 Sokolí hnízdo Chateau
 Starý Žeberk Castle
 Stekník Chateau
 Střekov Castle 
 Sukorady Chateau
 Světec Chateau
 Šauenštejn Castle
 Šebín Castle
 Škrle Chateau
 Šluknov Chateau
 Štern Chateau
 Šumburk Castle

T
 Teplice Chateau
 Tolštejn Castle 
 Toužetín Chateau
 Trmice Chateau
 Třebívlice Chateau
 Třebušín Chateau
 Tuchlov Chateau
 Tuchořice Chateau

U
 Úštěk Castle

V
 Varta Castle
 Velké Březno Chateau
 Velké Žernoseky Chateau
 Velký Újezd Chateau
 Vidhostice Chateau
 Vinařice Castle
 Vintířov - Nový zámek Chateau
 Vintířov - Starý zámek Chateau
 Vlčí Hrádek Castle
 Vrabinec Castle
 Vrbičany Chateau
 Vršovice Chateau

Z
 Zahořany Chateau
  Chateau
 Žerotín Castle
 Žitenice Chateau

See also
 List of castles in the Czech Republic
 List of castles in Europe
 List of castles

External links 
 Castles, Chateaux, and Ruins 
 Czech Republic - Manors, Castles, Historical Towns
 Hrady.cz 

Castles in the Ústí nad Labem Region
Usti nad Labem